Philippe Le Sourd (born 15 July 1963) is a French cinematographer.  He received a nomination for the Academy Award for Best Cinematography  for his work on 2013 film The Grandmaster.

Filmography
Peut-être (1999)
A Good Year (2006)
Seven Pounds (2008)
The Grandmaster (2013)
The Beguiled (2017)
On the Rocks (2020)
Priscilla (TBA)

References

External links

1963 births
Living people
Cinematographers from Paris
French cinematographers